Pepper: Remixes & Rarities is a 1998 compilation album by Alpha. It includes remixes of 5 tracks from their debut album, Come from Heaven, with 3 additional tracks.

Track listing 

 Sample
"Down By Law" by Fab Five Freddy and Chris Stein on With (Underdog Remix)

Personnel
Credits adapted from liner notes.
Alpha – production (3, 7, 8)
 Martin Barnard – vocals (6)
 Lewis Parker – vocals (1)
 Helen White – vocals (1, 5)
More Rockers – remix (2)
 Receiver – remix (6)
 Tim Simenon – additional production, remix (4)
 Underdog – additional production, remix (1, 5)

References

External links
 

1998 compilation albums
Alpha (band) albums
Melankolic albums
Virgin Records albums